Banri (written: 万里 or 萬里) is a masculine Japanese given name. Notable people with the name include:

, Japanese politician
, Japanese photographer

Fictional characters:
, protagonist of the light novel series Golden Time
, a character in the manga series Inu x Boku SS
Banri Settsu (摂津 万里), a character in the video game A3!

Japanese masculine given names